North African and Middle Eastern Australians are Australians of Middle Eastern and North African ancestry, whether full or partial, including naturalised Australians who are immigrants from specific regions in and around the Middle East and North Africa and descendants of such immigrants. This includes people whose background is from the various Middle Eastern and West Asian ethnic groups, such as the Kurds and Assyrians, as well as immigrants from modern-day countries of the Arab world, Iran, Israel, and Turkey.

Demographics 
Notably, Australia does not collect statistics on the racial origins of its residents, instead collecting data at each five-yearly census on distinct ancestries, of which each census respondent may choose up to two.

Social and political issues

Asylum seekers 
Asylum policy is a contentious wedge issue in Australian politics, with the two major political parties in Australia arguing that the issue is a border control problem and one concerning the safety of those attempting to come to Australia by boat.

In 1999, Middle Eastern immigrants fleeing from oppressive regimes in Afghanistan, Iran and Iraq began to arrive in large numbers. The Howard Government extended the time they spent in mandatory detention and introduced temporary protection visas for boat arrivals. The deterrents did little to stop immigrants; roughly 12,000 asylum seekers reached Australia from 1999 to 2001.
In 2011, Australia received 2.5% of the world's total number of claims for asylum. During 2012, more than 17,000 asylum seekers arrived via boat. The majority of the refugees came from Afghanistan, Iran, and Sri Lanka. In June 2012, a boatload of asylum seekers capsized in the Indian Ocean between Indonesia and Christmas Island, leading to 17 confirmed deaths, with 70 other people missing.

In 2015, the government rejected suggestions that it would accept Rohingyas (a persecuted Muslim minority in Myanmar) during the Rohingya refugee crisis, with the Prime Minister Tony Abbott responding "Nope, nope, nope. We have a very clear refugee and humanitarian program". However, later in the year the government unexpectedly increased its intake of refugees to accommodate persecuted minorities, such as Maronites, Yazidis and Druze, from the conflicts of the Syrian Civil War and Iraq War. (It was these refugees who swelled the figures for 2016–2017.)

Race-based discrimination and violence

Antisemitism

Islamophobia 

Islamophobia is highly speculative and affective distrust and hostility towards Muslims, Islam, and those perceived as following the religion. This social aversion and bias is often facilitated and perpetuated in the media through the stereotyping of Muslims as violent and uncivilised. Various Australian politicians and political commentators have capitalised on these negative stereotypes and this has contributed to the marginalisation, discrimination and exclusion of the Muslim community.

Islamophobia and intolerance towards Muslims existed well prior to the September 11 attacks in the United States. For example, Muslim immigration to Australia was restricted under the White Australia Policy (1901-1975).

Notable contributions 
For principal lists of notable people, see the relevant articles for each relevant ethnicity.

Notes

References 

 
 
Middle Eastern people
Middle Eastern diaspora
North African people
North African diaspora
Ethnic groups in Australia